Anatoliy Dmytrovych Chantsev (born 20 February 1958) is a former defender and midfielder, now coach.

External links 
Interview on the Official Website of Zorya
 

1958 births
Living people
Footballers from Zaporizhzhia
Soviet footballers
Association football defenders
FC Metalurh Zaporizhzhia players
FC Torpedo Zaporizhzhia players
NK Veres Rivne players
FC Gomel players
Ukrainian football managers
FC Metalurh Zaporizhzhia managers
FC Zorya Luhansk managers
FC Helios Kharkiv managers
Ukrainian Premier League managers
FC Karpaty Lviv managers
Ukrainian expatriate sportspeople in Belarus